Marriage of Convenience is a Polish musical comedy from 1966 directed by Stanisław Bareja.

Cast
 Daniel Olbrychski – Andrzej
 Elżbieta Czyżewska – Joanna
 Bohdan Łazuka – Edzio Siedlecki
 Hanka Bielicka – Joanna's mother
 Bogumił Kobiela – „engineer” Kwilecki
 Wiesława Kwaśniewska – Magda
 Jacek Fedorowicz – director
 Wojciech Pokora – secret agent
 Andrzej Zaorski – visual artist
 Wojciech Rajewski – professor Lipski
 Bolesław Płotnicki – Joanna's father
 Kazimierz Wichniarz – Magda's father
 Janina Romanówna – aunt Edzia
 Alicja Bobrowska – mrs. Kwilecki
 Cezary Julski – Burczyk's helper
 Jarema Stępowski – painting marchand
 Tadeusz Chyła – band leader
 Stanisław Bareja – man buying a suit
 Witold Dębicki – Majk
 Wiesław Michnikowski – agent
 Gerard Wilk – dancer

References

1961 films
1960s Polish-language films
Films directed by Stanisław Bareja
1960s musical comedy films
Polish musical comedy films